A poet laureate (plural: poets laureate) is a poet officially appointed by a government or conferring institution, typically expected to compose poems for special events and occasions. Albertino Mussato of Padua and Francesco Petrarca (Petrarch) of Arezzo were the first to be crowned poets laureate after the classical age, respectively in 1315 and 1342. In Britain, the term dates from the appointment of Bernard André by Henry VII of England. The royal office of Poet Laureate in England dates from the appointment of John Dryden in 1668.

In modern times a poet laureate title may be conferred by an organization such as the Poetry Foundation, which designates a Young People's Poet Laureate, unconnected with the National Youth Poet Laureate and the United States Poet Laureate.

The office is also popular with regional and community groups. Examples include the Pikes Peak Poet Laureate, which is designated by a "Presenting Partners" group from within the community, the Minnesota poet laureate chosen by the League of Minnesota Poets (est. 1934), the Northampton Poet Laureate chosen by the Northampton Arts Council, and the Martha's Vineyard Poet Laureate chosen by ten judges representing the Martha's Vineyard Poetry Society.

Over a dozen national governments continue the poet laureate tradition.

Background 
In ancient Greece, the laurel was used to form a crown or wreath of honour for poets and heroes. The custom derives from the ancient myth of Daphne and Apollo (Daphne signifying "laurel" in Greek), and was revived in Padua for Albertino Mussato, followed by Petrarch's own crowning ceremony in the audience hall of the medieval senatorial palazzo on the Campidoglio on April 8, 1341. Because the Renaissance figures who were attempting to revive the Classical tradition lacked detailed knowledge of the Roman precedent they were attempting to emulate, these ceremonies took on the character of doctoral candidatures.

Since the office of poet laureate has become widely adopted, the term "laureate" has come to signify recognition for preeminence or superlative achievement (cf. Nobel laureate). A royal degree in rhetoric, poet laureate was awarded at European universities in the Middle Ages. The term therefore may refer to the holder of such a degree, which recognized skill in rhetoric, grammar, and language.

By country

Australia

On 30 January 2023, at the launch of 'Revive', Australia's new cultural policy, Prime Minister Anthony Albanese announced “the establishment of a poet laureate for Australia”. Before 2023, Australia had not had an official poet laureate scheme, despite past suggestions.  In 1818, former convict Michael Massey Robinson was paid by colony governor Lachlan Macquarie for services as poet laureate.  Over the years, other poets have been nominated as worthy of such a title, including James Brunton Stephens (1835–1902), Andrew Barton 'Banjo' Paterson (1864–1941), and Les Murray (1938–2019).

Barbados 

The first Poet Laureate of Barbados was chosen in 2018. Her name is Esther Phillips.

Belgium 

The first Poet Laureate of Belgium, Charles Ducal, was chosen in 2014. He was followed by Laurence Vielle, Els Moors, Carl Norac, and Mustafa Kör.

Canada

The Canadian Parliamentary Poet Laureate is appointed as an officer of the Library of Parliament. The position alternates between an English and French speaking laureate. Candidates must be able to write in both English and French, have a substantial publication history (including poetry) displaying literary excellence and have written work reflecting Canada, among other criteria.

Poets who have served in the position include:
 George Bowering (2002-2004)  
 Pauline Michel (2004-2006) 
 John Steffler (2006-2008) 
 Pierre DesRuisseaux (2009-2011) 
 Fred Wah (2011-2013) 
 Michel Pleau (2014-2016) 
 George Elliott Clarke (2016-2017) 
 Georgette LeBlanc (2018-2019) 
 Louise Bernice Halfe a.k.a. Sky Dancer (2021–present)

Provincial and municipal poets laureate

Currently, only the provinces of Ontario, Prince Edward Island, Saskatchewan and Yukon have appointed a poet laureate.

Alberta

Cities
Calgary's current poet laureate is Wakefield Brewster (2022-2024). He was preceded in office by Natalie Meisner (2020 – 2022), Sheri-D Wilson (2018-2020), Micheline Maylor (2016 – 2018), Derek Beaulieu (2014 – 2016), and Kris Demeanor (2012 – 2014).
Banff has had three poets laureate, Derek Beaulieu (2022-2023), Amelie Patternson (2017-2018) and Steven Ross Smith (2019-2020) 
The current Poet Laureate of Edmonton is Titilope Sonuga (2021-2023). She was preceded in office by Nishi Patel (2019 – 2021), Ahmed “Knowmadic” Ali (2017-2019), Pierrette Requier (2015 – 2017), Mary Pinkoski (2013 – 2015), Anna Marie Sewell (2011 – 2012), Roland Pemberton (2006 – 2011), E.D. Blodgett (2007 – 2009), and Alice Major (2005 – 2007).

British Columbia

Cities
Comox Valley has had three poets laureate: Lawrence J.W. Cooper (2019-2021), Natalie Nickerson (2017-2019), and Kevin Flesher (2015-2017).
The Poets Laureate of Nanaimo include Kamal Parmar (2021-2023), Tina Biello (2017 – 2020), and Naomi Beth Wakan (2013 – 2016).
New Westminster's Poets Laureate are Elliott Slinn (2021–present), Alan Hill (2017 – 2020), Candice James (2010 – 2016), Don Benson (1999 – 2007), and Edna Anderson (1998 – 1999) 
Surrey has had one poet laureate, Renée Sarojini Saklikar (2015 – 2018)
Tofino's poets laureate are Christine Lowther (2020-2022) and Joanna Streetly (2018 – 2020)
Vancouver's poets laureate are Fiona Tinwei Lam (2021–present), Miss Christie Lee (Christie Charles) (2018-2021), Rachel Rose (2014 – 2017), Evelyn Lau (2011 – 2014), Brad Cran (2009 – 2011), and George McWhirter (2007 – 2009).
Victoria's poets laureate are John Barton (2019 – 2022), Yvonne Blomer (2015 – 2018), Janet Marie Rogers (2012 – 2014), Linda Rogers (2009 – 2011), and Carla Funk (2006 – 2008).

Manitoba

Cities
 Winnipeg's poets laureate are Duncan Mercredi (2020-2022) and Di Brandt (2018-2019)

New Brunswick

Cities
 Fredericton's Poets Laureate are David "Dav" Pond (2022–present), Jordan Trethewey (2021-2022), Jenna Lyn Albert (2019 – 2021) and Ian Letourneau (2016 – 2018).
 Moncton's poets laureate or Poets Flyé-es are Kayla Geitzler (English) and Jean-Philippe Raîche (French) (2019 – Present) 
 Sackville's poets laureate are Laura K. Watson (2021–present) Shoshanna Wingate (2019 – 2021), Marilyn Lerch (2013 – 2017), and Douglas Lochhead (2002 – 2011).

Newfoundland and Labrador

Cities
 St. John's poets laureate are Mary Dalton (2019 – 2022), George Murray (2014 – 2017), Tom Dawe (2010 – 2013), and Agnes Walsh (2006 – 2009).

Nova Scotia

Cities
 Cape Breton: Rita Joe (1932 – 2007) was appointed Lifetime “Poet Laureate of the Mi’kmaq people” 

 Halifax poets laureate are Dr. Afua Cooper (2018 – 2020), Rebecca Thomas (2016 – 2018), El Jones (2013 – 2015), Tanya Davis (2011 – 2012), Shauntay Grant (2009 – 2011), Lorri Neilsen Glenn (2005 – 2009), and Sue MacLeod (2001 – 2005).

Ontario

In 2021 Ontario named its first poet laureate Randell Adjei.

Cities

 The city of Barrie has had two poets laureate Victoria Butler (2018 – present) and Damian Lopes (2014 – present) 
 The city of Brantford named John B. Lee poet laureate in perpetuity in 2005.
 The town of Cobalt named Ann Margetson poet laureate 
 Cobourg’s poets laureate are Jessica Outram (2019 – 2022), Ted Amsden (2011 – 2018), Jill Battson (2009 – 2011), and Eric Winter (1997 – 2009) 
 Dufferin County's poets laureate is Harry Posner (2017–present) 
 Emery: Laurence Hutchman (2018 – present) 
 Kingston’s poets laureate are Jason Heroux (2019 – present), Helen Humphreys (2015 –  2019), and Eric Folsom (2011 – 2015).
 London’s poets laureate are Tom Cull (2016 – present), and Penn Kemp (2011 – 2013)
 Mississauga's poets laureate are Ayomide Bayowa (2021-2024), Paul Edward Costa (2019 – 2021), Wali Shah (2017 – 2019), and Anna Yin (2015 – 2017).
 In Norfolk County John B. Lee was appointed in 2011.
 Ottawa’s poets laureate are Albert Dumont (Anglophone) (2021-2022)  and Gilles Latour (Francophone) (2021-2022), Margaret Michèle Cook (Francophone) and Diana Young (Anglophone) (2019 – 2021), Andrée Lacelle (Francophone) and Jamaal Jackson Rogers (Anglophone) (2017 – 2019).
 Owen Sound’s poets laureate are Richard-Yves Sitoski (2019 – 2022), Lauren Best (2017-2019), Rob Rolfe & Larry Jensen (2015 – 2017), Terry Burns (2013 – 2014), Kateri Akiwenzie-Damm (2011 – 2012), Kristan Anderson (2008 – 2010), Liz Zetlin (2007 – 2008).
 Greater Sudbury’s poets laureate are Kyla Heming (2022–present), Vera Constantineau (2020-2022), Chloé LaDuchesse (2018 – 2020), Kim Fahner (2016 – 2018), Thomas Leduc (2014 – 2015), Daniel Aubin (2012 – 2013), and Roger Nash (2010 – 2011) 
 The Poet Laureate of Toronto program was established in 2001, naming Dennis Lee as the first poet laureate.  Successors include: A. F. Moritz (2019 – 2022), Anne Michaels (2016 – 2019), George Elliott Clarke (2012 – 2015), Dionne Brand (2009 – 2012), and Pier Giorgio Di Cicco (2004 – 2009).
 The city of Windsor poets laureate are Mary Ann Mulhern (2019 – 2022), Marty Gervais (2011 – 2019), Vanessa Shields (April 2022- September 2022), and Peter Hrastovec (2023 - 2027).
 The city of Woodstock posthumously named Barry C. Butson poet laureate emeritus.

Prince Edward Island
Prince Edward Island appointed its first poet laureate, John Smith, in 2003.

 Julie Pellissier-Lush (2019–present)
 Deirdre Kessler (2016-2019)
 Diane Hicks Morrow (2013-2016)
 Hugh MacDonald (2009-2013)
 David Helwig (2008-2009)
 Frank Ledwell (2004-2007)
 John Smith (2002-2004)

Saskatchewan
Saskatchewan appointed its first poet laureate, Glen Sorestad, in 2000.

 Carol Rose GoldenEagle (2021–present) 
 Bruce Rice (2019 - 2021)
 Brenda Schmidt (2017 - 2018)
 Gerry Hill (2016 - 2017)
 Judith Krause (2014 - 2015) 
 Don Kerr (2011 - 2013)
 Robert Currie (2007 - 2010) 
 Louise B. Halfe (Sky Dancer) (2005 - 2006) 
 Glen Sorestad (2000 - 2004)

Yukon
Inaugural Yukon Provincial Poet Laureate PJ Yukon has held the office since 1994.

The Commissioner of Yukon established the Story Laureate of Yukon role in 2020. The inaugural position was held by Michael Gates.

Dominican Republic

Poets Laureate of Dominican Republic include: Pedro Mir (1984).

Ethiopia

Officially designated Laureate includes Tsegaye Gebre-Medhin. Tsegaye's award was granted by His Majesty, Haile-Selasie II.

Germany

Poets Laureate of Nazi Germany include: Hanns Johst from 1935 to 1946.

 was declared the Stadtschreiber of three different cities in Germany: Rheinsberg in 1999, Remscheid in 2004, and Trier in 2007.

Holy See

Popes have several times named poets laureate, but the practice irregular.

India

Andhra Pradesh
Saanvi Sharma was the first poet laureate of Andhra Pradesh, India.

Tamil Nadu 

Kannadasan was the poet laureate of Tamil Nadu at the time of his death.

Iran

Malek o-Sho'arā Bahār was the poet laureate of Mozaffar ad-Din Shah Qajar. He was born in Mashhad in 1884 (died 1951) and was a conservative figure among the modernists.

Ireland

The Kingdom of Ireland had a poet laureate; the last holder of the title was Robert Jephson, who died in 1803.

The closest modern equivalent is the title Saoi ["wise one"] held by up to seven members at a time of Aosdána, an official body of those engaged in fine arts, literature, and music. Poets awarded the title include Máire Mhac an tSaoi, Anthony Cronin, and Seamus Heaney.

Jamaica

Thomas MacDermot was the first poet laureate of Jamaica during colonial times, followed by Je Clare McFarlane. Mervyn Morris was the first poet laureate of Jamaica upon its independence, from 2014 to 2017, followed by Lorna Goodison from 2017 to 2020. The poet laureate of Jamaica for 2021 to 2024 is Olive Senior.

Netherlands

The unofficial Poet Laureate of Netherlands is Tsead Bruinja as Dichter des Vaderlands (Poet of the Fatherland). The previous laureate was Ester Naomi Perquin. Gerrit Komrij was the first Dichter des Vaderlands. The title was created by Dutch media.

New Zealand

New Zealand has had an official poet laureate since 1998. Originally sponsored by Te Mata vineyards and known as the Te Mata Estate Poet Laureate, the award is now administered by the National Library of New Zealand and the holder is called New Zealand Poet Laureate. The term of office is two years. The symbol of office is a Tokotoko, a carved wooden ceremonial orator's staff.

The first holder was Bill Manhire, in 1998–99, then Hone Tuwhare (2000–01), Elizabeth Smither (2002–03), Brian Turner (2004–05), Jenny Bornholdt (2006–07), Michele Leggott (2008–09), Cilla McQueen (2009–11), Ian Wedde (2011–13), Vincent O'Sullivan (2013–15), C. K. Stead (2015–2017), Selina Tusitala Marsh (2017-2019), and David Eggleton (2019-2021).

Nigeria

Poets Laureate of Nigeria include: Obo Aba Hisanjani.

North Korea

Beginning around 1994, North Korea had 6 active poets laureate who worked in the epic genre. Epic poetry was the chief vehicle of political propaganda during the rule of Kim Jong-il, and the poets worked according to the requests and needs of Kim Jong-il. Some of the poets are Jang Jin-sung (pseudonym), Kim Man-young and Shin Byung-gang.

Saint Lucia

Poets Laureate of Saint Lucia include: Derek Walcott.

Serbia

Matija Bećković
Charles Simić
Slobodan Selenić
Jovan Dučić

Sierra Leone

Poets laureate of Sierra Leone include the Italian authors Roberto Malini and Dario Picciau.

Somalia

Poets laureate of Somalia include: Hadraawi.

Turkey

Mehmet Akif Ersoy was the Poet-Laureate, born in 1873 and died on December 27, 1936, famous Turkish poet. He composed the poem to be the National Anthem of the Turkish Republic that written in 1921. Original name of the poem is "İstiklal Marşı"

United Kingdom

England

In England, the term "poet laureate" is restricted to the official office of Poet Laureate, attached to the royal household. However, no authoritative historical record exists of the office of Poet Laureate of England.

The office developed from earlier practice when minstrels and versifiers were members of the king's retinue. Richard Cœur-de-Lion had a versificator regis (English: king's poet), Gulielmus Peregrinus (William the Pilgrim), and Henry III had a versificator named Master Henry. In the fifteenth century, John Kay, a versifier, described himself as Edward IV's "humble poet laureate".

According to Wharton,  King Henry I paid 10 shillings a year to a versificator regis. Geoffrey Chaucer (1340–1400) was called Poet Laureate, being granted in 1389 an annual allowance of wine. W. Hamilton describes Chaucer, Gower, Kay, Andrew Bernard, John Skelton, Robert Whittington, Richard Edwards and Samuel Daniel as "volunteer Laureates".

John Skelton studied at the University of Oxford in the early 1480s and was advanced to the degree of "poet laureate" in 1488, when he joined the court of King Henry VII to tutor the future Henry VIII. The title of laureate was also conferred on him by the University of Louvain in 1492 and by the University of Cambridge in 1492–3.
But I pray mayster John Skelton, late created poete laureate in the unyversite of Oxenforde, to oversee and correct this sayd booke.

The academic use of the term laureate became associated again with royalty when King James I created a pension for Ben Jonson in 1617, although there is no formal record extant. He was succeeded by William Davenant.

The royal office Poet Laureate was officially conferred by letters patent on John Dryden in 1668, after Davenant's death, and the post became a regular institution. Dryden's successor Shadwell originated annual birthday and New Year odes. The poet laureate became responsible for writing and presenting official verses to commemorate both personal occasions, such as the monarch's birthday or royal births and marriages, and public occasions, such as coronations and military victories. His activity in this respect varied according to circumstances, and the custom ceased to be obligatory after Pye's death. The office fell into some contempt before Robert Southey, but took on a new lustre from his personal distinction and that of successors Wordsworth and Tennyson. Wordsworth stipulated before accepting the honour that no formal effusions from him should be required. Due to his age, he became the only laureate to write no official poetry. Tennyson was generally happy in his numerous poems of this class.

On Tennyson's death there was a considerable feeling that there was no acceptable successor. William Morris and Swinburne were hardly suitable as court poets. Eventually the undesirability of breaking the tradition for temporary reasons, and severing the one official link between literature and the state, prevailed over the protests against allowing someone of inferior genius to follow Tennyson. Abolition was similarly advocated when Warton and Wordsworth died.

Edward Gibbon condemned the position's artificial approach to poetry:

The salary has varied, but traditionally includes some alcohol. Ben Jonson first received a pension of 100 marks, and later an annual "terse of Canary wine". Dryden had a pension of £300 and a butt of Canary wine. Pye received £27 instead of the wine. Tennyson drew £72 a year from the Lord Chamberlain's department, and £27 from the Lord Steward's "in lieu of the butt of sack". The modern annual salary is £5,750.  On 10 May 2019 Simon Armitage was appointed  after the end of Carol Ann Duffy's ten-year tenure.

There are other, non-official, laureate titles, such as the commercially sponsored "Children's Laureate" for an "eminent writer or illustrator of children's books to celebrate outstanding achievement in their field", and the Poetry Foundation's Young People's Poet Laureate.

Scotland 

Scotland has a long tradition of makars and poetry. In 2004 the Scottish Parliament appointed Professor Edwin Morgan as the first Makar or National Poet for Scotland. On his death in January 2011 he was succeeded by Liz Lochhead. 
Kathleen Jamie became Scotland's fourth Makar in 2021.

Wales 

Wales has had a long tradition of poets and bards under royal patronage, with extant writing from medieval royal poets and earlier. The office of National Poet for Wales was established in April 2005. The first holder, Gwyneth Lewis, was followed by Gwyn Thomas.

United States

The United States Library of Congress appointed a Consultant in Poetry to the Library of Congress from 1937 to 1984. An Act of Congress changed the name in 1985 to Poet Laureate Consultant in Poetry to the Library of Congress.

Poets laureate receive a US$35,000 stipend and are given the responsibility of overseeing an ongoing series of poetry readings and lectures at the library, and a charge to promote poetry. No other duties are specified, and laureates are not required to compose for government events or in praise of government officials. However, after the September 11 terrorist attacks, then poet laureate Billy Collins was asked to write a poem to be read in front of a special joint session of Congress. Collins wrote "The Names", which he read on September 6, 2002, and which is available in streaming audio and video.  The original intent of the stipend was to provide poets laureate with a full income, so that they could devote their time entirely to writing poetry. The amount has not been adjusted for inflation and is now considered a moderate bonus intended to supplement a poet's already existing income. Most Poets Laureate earn the bulk of their income through university employment.

Ada Limón is the current poet laureate. Previous poets laureate include Joy Harjo, Tracy K. Smith (two terms), Juan Felipe Herrera, Philip Levine, W. S. Merwin, Kay Ryan, Charles Simic, Ted Kooser, Louise Glück, Billy Collins, Rita Dove, Elizabeth Bishop, Robert Frost, Karl Shapiro, Allen Tate, Robert Penn Warren, Richard Wilbur, Joseph Brodsky, Stanley Kunitz, Robert Hass, Donald Hall, Robert Pinsky (three terms), Mark Strand, Audre Lorde, and Maxine Kumin.

Amanda Gorman was the United States's first National Youth Poet Laureate appointed in 2017.

A number of American state legislatures have also created an office of poet laureate. The holders may be locally or nationally prominent. The U.S. states of New Jersey, Massachusetts, Michigan, and Pennsylvania do not currently have a state poet laureate position.

District of Columbia

The United States' capital, the District of Columbia, created the position of Poet Laureate of the District of Columbia in 1984 during the mayoralty of Marion Barry. The position is filled by appointment from the mayor of the district the DC Commission on the Arts and Humanities. The District of Columbia's poet laureate program is currently stalled.
Only two poets laureate have been appointed since the creation of the position. Sterling Allen Brown was appointed by Mayor Marion Barry, serving from 1984 until his death in 1989. Dolores Kendrick was appointed by Mayor Anthony A. Williams, serving from 1999 until her death in 2017.

Alabama

The office of Poet Laureate of Alabama was created for Samuel Minturn Peck in 1930. The post has been continuously filled since 1954 on a four-year renewable basis. Poets laureate serve at the pleasure of the governor. Successors include Helen Norris, Sue Walker, and Andrew Glaze.

Alaska

Originally created as the position of Poet Laureate in 1963 (House Resolution 25). The official name was changed in 1996 to recognize and honor all genres of writing. The position is selected by the Alaska State Council on the Arts.

Arizona

The state of Arizona established a state Poet Laureate position in 2013, appointing Alberto Ríos as the inaugural Poet Laureate.

Arkansas

Charles T. Davis was the first poet laureate of Arkansas, appointed in 1923.

California

The state of California established a state Poet Laureate under Governor Hiram Warren Johnson  and appointed Ina Donna Coolbrith on June 30, 1915. Coolbrith was later acknowledged as the "Loved Laurel-Crowned Poet of California" by a 1919 state Senate resolution, retaining the title until her death in 1928. Juan Felipe Herrera was appointed by Gov. Jerry Brown in March 2012. The position is currently vacant. It was last held by Dana Gioia from 2015 to 2018.

Counties
Kern County's first poet laureate was chosen in 2016: Don Thompson.
Lake County's first poet laureate, Jim Lyle, was chosen in 1998.
Marin County's first Poet Laureate was appointed in 2008: Albert Flynn DeSilver
Napa County's first poet laureate was appointed in 2002: Dorothy Lee Hansen.
San Mateo County's first poet laureate was appointed in 2014: Caroline Goodwin. She was followed by Lisa Rosenberg in 2017 and Aileen Casinetto in 2019.
Santa Clara County appointed its first Poet Laureate in 2009: Nils Peterson

Cities

 Albany chose its first poet laureate, Christina Hutchins, in 2008.
 Anaheim selected its first poet laureate, Grant Hier, in 2018.
 Benicia appointed its first poet laureate in 2006, Joel Fallon. He was followed by Robert Shelby, Ronna Leon, Lois Requist, Don Peery, Johanna Ely, Tom Stanton, and Mary Susan Gast.
Berkeley selected its first Poet Laureate in 2017: Rafael Jesús González Before this, in 2004, Julia Vinograd had been recognised officially as Berkeley's unofficial poet laureate.
Cupertino's first Poet Laureate, Dave Denny, was selected in 2010.
 El Cerrito selected its first poet laureate, Maw Shein Win in summer 2016.
 Fairfield's first poet laureate was Juanita J. Martin. She was succeeded by Bonnie DiMichele and Suzanne Bruce.
East Palo Alto's Poet Laureate is Kalamu Chaché.
 Fresno selected James Tyner as its first poet laureate in 2013.
 Livermore's first poet laureate was Connie Post.
 Los Angeles selected its first poet laureate, Eloise Klein Healy, in December 2012.
Richmond's poet laureate program began in 2004 with three laureates: Brenda Quintanilla (student), Donte Clark (non-senior adult), Lincoln Bergman (senior).
Sacramento's first poets laureate were Dennis Schmitz and Viola Weinberg, who served two years beginning in 2000.
San Francisco's first poet laureate, Lawrence Ferlinghetti, was selected in 1998. He was followed by Janice Mirikitani, Devorah Major, Jack Hirschman, Diane di Prima, Alejandro Murguía, and Kim Shuck. The current poet laureate is Tongo Eisen-Martin.
Santa Barbara's first poet laureate was Barry Spacks, appointed in 2005. He was followed by Perie Longo, David Starkey, Paul Willis, Chryss Yost, Sojourner Kincaid Rolle, Enid Osborn, and Laure-Anne Bosselaar. The current poet laureate is Emma Trelles.
Vallejo's first poet laureate was Genea Brice appointed in 2015, followed by D.L. Lang in 2017, and Jeremy Snyder currently holds the position.

Colorado

Colorado Poets Laureate are currently appointed to four-year terms. They are nominated by Colorado Creative Industries and Colorado Humanities & Center for the Book, and chosen by the Governor. Alice Polk Hill was the first poet laureate of Colorado serving from 1919 to 1921. Successors include Thomas Hornsby Ferril, Mary Crow, David Mason and Bobby LeFebre. The State of Colorado also appointed singer/songwriter writer John Denver in 1974.

Cities
Chris Ransick served as poet laureate of Denver 2006 to 2010.
Janice Gould served as poet laureate of Pikes Peak from 2014 to 2016.

Connecticut

The Poet Laureate of Connecticut was established in 1985 by Public Act 85-221 of the Connecticut General Assembly. Five-year residents of the state with a demonstrated career in poetry are eligible for the honorary appointment as an advocate for poetry and literary arts. James Merill was the first poet laureate of Connecticut, serving from 1985 to 1995. His successors include Leo Connellan, Marilyn Nelson, John Hollander, Dick Allen, Margaret Gibson. Antoinette Brim-Bell is the current poet laureate for Connecticut.

Delaware

Poets are appointed to the position by the governor. The first poet laureate of Delaware was Edna Deemer Leach appointed in 1947. Nnamdi Chukwuocha and Albert Mills—twin brothers who are known as the "Twin Poets"—were appointed 17th Poets Laureate of the State of Delaware on December 13, 2015. According to the Library of Congress, they are the first co-laureates appointed by a state and the first siblings to share the position. Predecessors include Fleda Brown and JoAnn Balingit.

Florida

Poets Laureate of Florida are appointed by the governor and the Division of Arts and Culture. They first served lifetime, unpaid appointments, until June 20, 2014, when HB 513 established a four-year term.  The first poet laureate of Florida was Franklin L. Wood, appointed in 1929 and died soon after assuming office. Vivian Laramore Rader was appointed in 1931 and served until her death in 1975. Edmund Skellings was appointed in 1980. A stroke that impaired his speech and limited his ability to do all of his official duties. He died August 19, 2012, leaving the post vacant. Peter Meinke currently holds this position and was appointed on June 15, 2015.

Georgia

Frank Lebby Stanton served from 1925 to 1927 as Georgia's first poet laureate. Successors include Ernest Neal, Conrad Aiken, David Bottoms, Judson Mitcham, and Chelsea Rathburn.

Hawaii

Prior to statehood Don Blanding, originally from Oklahoma, was unofficially referred to as the poet laureate of Hawaii. In 1951 Hawaii Territorial Senator Thelma Akana Harrison in concurrent resolution 28, declared Lloyd Stone, who was originally from California, poet laureate. When the modern program was established, Native Hawaiian Kealoha was appointed on May 3, 2012, by Governor Neil Abercrombie., and he is the first poet laureate for the state of Hawaii, serving through 2022.

Idaho

Irene Welch Grissom served from 1923 to 1948 as Idaho's first poet laureate. Sudie Stuart Hager served as the second poet laureate from 1949 to 1982. After 1982 the title was changed to Writer in Residence.

Illinois

Illinois appointed its first poet laureate, Howard Austin, in 1936, followed by Carl Sandburg (1962–1967), and Gwendolyn Brooks (1968–2000), all with lifetime appointments. The post is now a four-year renewable award.  The poet laureate from 2003 to 2017 was Kevin Stein.  In 2020, Angela Jackson was named Illinois Poet Laureate. Singer songwriter John Prine was posthumously named an Honorary Poet Laureate.

Indiana

Joyce Brinkman was appointed as the first poet laureate of Indiana, serving from 2005 to 2008

Iowa

The position was created July 1, 1999, by Subchapter 303.89 of the Iowa Code with a two-year renewable term. Marvin Bell was Iowa's first Poet Laureate, from 2000 to 2004, followed by Robert Dana from 2004 to 2008, and Mary Swander from 2009 to 2019. Debra Marquart is the current Poet Laureate of Iowa. Her two-year term started in May 2019.

Kansas

Jonathan Holden served as Kansas' first poet laureate from 2005 to 2007.

Kentucky

James Thomas Cotton Noe served as Kentucky's first poet laureate from 1926 to 1953.

Louisiana

Emma Wilson Emery served as Louisiana's first poet laureate from 1942 to 1970. The current poet laureate of Louisiana is Mona Lisa Saloy appointed in April 2021. Predecessors include Ava Leavell Haymon, Julie Kane, Peter Cooley, and John Warner Smith.

Maine
 
Kate Barnes served as Maine's first poet laureate from 1996 to 1999. The current poet laureate of Maine is Julia Bouwsna. Predecessors include Wesley McNair, Baron Wormser, and Betsy Sholl.

Maryland

The current Poet Laureate of Maryland is Grace Cavalieri.

Cities
The city of Takoma Park Poet Laureate program, established in 2005, honors the achievements of a local poet, encouraging a wider appreciation of poetry and literature. Kathleen O’Toole currently holds the office. Poet Laureate emeritus include Donald Berger (2005-2007), Anne Becker (2007-2011), and Merrill Leffler (2011-2018).

Massachusetts

The state of Massachusetts does not currently have a poet laureate position. However, many cities in Massachusetts have appointed poets laureate.

Cities

Miriam Levine was appointed the first poet laureate of Arlington in 2015
Sam Cornish was appointed the first Boston poet laureate in 2008, succeeded in 2015 by Danielle Legros Georges. The current Poet Laureate of Boston is Porsha Olayiwola.
Martin Espada was the first poet laureate of Northampton in 2003. Successors include Janet Aalfs and Patrick Donnelly.
Stephan Delbos was appointed the first poet laureate of Plymouth in 2020.

Michigan
Edgar A. Guest served as Michigan Poet Laureate from 1952 through 1959 having been appointed Poet Laureate through Senate Concurrent Resolution No. 38 (1952) of the Michigan Legislature. State lawmakers made three separate unsuccessful attempts to reinstate a poet laureate position in 2000, 2005, and 2019.

Minnesota

In May 2007, Gov. Pawlenty reversed his opposition and signed Section 4, Chapter 148 of the Minnesota Session Laws 2007, establishing the state poet laureate. Robert Bly was appointed the first Minnesota poet laureate on February 27, 2008, succeeded on August 23, 2011, by Joyce Sutphen. Dr. Gwen Westerman was appointed as the third Minnesota poet laureate on September 9, 2021, by Governor Tim Walz.

Mississippi 

In 1963, Governor Ross Barnett appointed Mississippi's first Poet Laureate, Maude Willard Leet Prenshaw. In 1973, Louise Moss Montgomery was named laureate by Gov. William Waller. Gov. Cliff Finch appointed Winifred Hamrick Farrar laureate in 1978. All three poets laureate served lifetime terms. Beginning in 2012, Mississippi poets laureate now serve four-year terms. Natasha Tretheway served as the Poet Laureate of Mississippi from 2012 to 2016. On August 10, 2016, Beth Ann Fennelly assumed the position.

Missouri

Walter Bargen served as Missouri's first poet laureate from 2008 to 2010.

Montana

Sandra Alcosser was Montana's first poet laureate, serving in the position from 2005 to 2007.

Nebraska

John G. Neihardt was appointed as Nebraskas first poet laureate in 1921, and served until November 3, 1973.

Nevada

Mildred Breedlove served as the first poet laureate of Nevada from 1957 to 2007.

New Hampshire

Paul Scott Mowrer was appointed as New Hampshire's first poet laureate, and served from 1968 to 1971. The current poet laureate of New Hampshire is Alexandria Peary, appointed October 2019. Predecessors include W. E. Butts, Richard Eberhart, Patricia Fargnoli, Cynthia Huntington, and Jane Kenyon.

New Jersey

New Jersey had a poet laureate program until from 2000 to 2003, appointing poet Gerald Stern followed by Amiri Baraka. The position was eliminated in 2003.

New Mexico 

In 2020 New Mexico appointed its first poet laureate, Levi Romero.

Cities
Hakim Bellamy was appointed the first poet laureate of Albuquerque in 2012.
Kayt Peck was appointed the first poet laureate of Las Vegas, New Mexico, in 2021.
Arthur Sze was appointed the first poet laureate of Santa Fe in 2006. Valerie Martínez is among his successors.
Bonnie Buckley Maldonado was appointed the first poet laureate of Silver City in 2012.
Sawnie Morris was appointed the first poet laureate of Taos in 2018.

New York 

The position of New York State Poet Laureate (official title: State Poet) was established by a special mandate of the New York State Legislature on August 1, 1985. Willie Perdomo is the current New York state poet laureate. Predecessors include John Ashbery, Billy Collins, Jane Cooper, Robert Creeley, Richard Howard, Marie Howe, Stanley Kunitz, Audre Lorde, Sharon Olds, Alicia Ostriker, and Jean Valentine. In 1988 New York also established position for other genres of writing entitled New York State Author. In 2016, Governor Andrew Cuomo also named Joseph Tusiani Poet Laureate Emeritus. In 2004, Ishle Yi Park became first female and the first Korean American poet laureate of the New York City borough of Queens.

North Carolina 

The 1935 General Assembly created the office of state poet laureate and empowers the Governor to appoint a North Carolina Poet Laureate. Jaki Shelton Green has been North Carolina's Poet Laureate since 2018.

Cities
The city of Durham, North Carolina, selected DJ Rogers as its first poet laureate in 2022.

North Dakota

Corbin A. Waldron was the first poet laureate of North Dakota from 1957 to 1978.

Ohio

The state of Ohio created the position of Poet Laureate in 2014. Dr. Amit Majmudar of Dublin, Ohio, was named the first state Poet Laureate by Gov. John Kasich, for a two-year term beginning January 1, 2016. Kari Gunter-Seymour is the current Poet Laureate of Ohio. Her term began on June 10, 2020.

Oklahoma

The state of Oklahoma named Violet McDougal its first poet laureate in 1923. Joe Kreger who first served from 1998 to 2001 was appointed a second term as Oklahoma's poet laureate from 2021 to 2022. The current poet laureate of Oklahoma is Jay Snider.

Cities
 Norman, Oklahoma, selected its first poet laureate, Dr. Julie Ann Ward, in April 2022. Norman is the first city in Oklahoma to have its own poet laureate.

Oregon

The position of Oregon Poet Laureate was established in 1923, appointing Edwin Markham as the first poet laureate. Anis Mojgani was appointed to the position in 2020.

Pennsylvania 

Samuel John Hazo served as Pennsylvania's first and only poet laureate from 1993 to 2003 before Governor Bob Casey eliminated the position.  Florence Van Leer Earle Coates was elected poet laureate of Pennsylvania by the state Federation of Women's Clubs in 1915.

Counties 
 Bucks County named Nicole Steinberg first poet laureate in 2021.
 Lancaster County's Lancaster Literary Guild named Barbara Buckman Strasko the first poet laureate of the county.

Cities 
 Harrisburg named Rick Kearns poet laureate in 2014.
 Philadelphia named Airea D. Matthews poet laureate of the city in 2022. Her predecessors include: Trapeta Mayson, Raquel Salas Rivera, Sonia Sanchez, Frank Sherlock, and Yolanda Wisher

Rhode Island

The State Poet of Rhode Island, established in 1987, is codified in Chapter 42-100 of the State of Rhode Island General Laws. The five-year appointment by the Governor carries an annual salary of $1,000.
Michael Steven Harper served as Rhode Island's first poet laureate from 1988 to 1993.

South Carolina

Archibald Rutledge was the first poet laureate of South Carolina, serving from 1934 to 1973.

South Dakota

Charles "Badger" Clark was the first poet laureate of South Dakota appointed in 1937.

Tennessee

"Pek" Gunn, a native of Bold Spring, Tennessee, and a close friend and politically ally of former Governor of Tennessee Frank Clement, was the first Tennessean given the title of State Poet Laureate, in the 1970s. Margaret Britton Vaughn is the current Poet Laureate, she is serving her lifetime appointment since 1999.

Texas

The state of Texas established a Poet Laureate in 1932 (historical list of Texas poets laureate). The term as of 2016 is one year.

Cities
In April 2012, San Antonio became the first Texas city to appoint a Poet Laureate, Carmen Tafolla. The San Antonio Poet Laureate serves a two-year term. Laurie Ann Guerrero was appointed on April 1, 2014.

Utah

The state of Utah has appointed a Poet Laureate since 1997. The first was David Lee (January 24, 1997, to December 2002), followed by Ken Brewer (January 24, 2003, to March 15, 2006), Katharine Coles (October 27, 2006, to May 2012), Lance Larsen, appointed May 3, 2012, by Governor Gary Herbert, and Paisley Rekdal, appointed by Governor Gary Herbert in May 2017. The current Poet Laureate in Utah is Lisa Bickmore appointed in April 2022.

Vermont

Robert Frost was the first poet laureate of Vermont, serving from 1961 to 1963.

Virginia

The Commonwealth of Virginia has appointed a Poet Laureate since December 18, 1936. The first was Carter Warner Wormeley, appointed for life. Appointments from 1942 until 1992 were for one year, with many reappointed for multiple terms. In 1992, the term was increased to two years. Since 1998 appointments are made from list of nominees presented by the Poetry Society of Virginia, established at the College of William & Mary in Williamsburg, Virginia, in 1923. The current Poet Laureate is Luisa A. Igloria.

Washington

The State of Washington has officially appointed a Poet Laureate since 2007, though Poets Laureate have been unofficially appointed by the Washington State Federation of Women's Clubs since 1931, when Ella Rhoads Higginson was named as the State's first Poet Laureate.

Samuel Green was named as Washington's first official Poet Laureate in 2007, and served until 2009. Poets Laureate of Washington are appointed for a two-year term by the Governor of Washington.

The current Poet Laureate of Washington is Rena Priest, a member of the Lummi Nation, and the first Indigenous person appointed to the post. She was appointed in 2021, and will serve until 2023.

Counties

Clark County

current Clark County Poet Laureate is Armin Tolentino, serving 2021-2024

former Clark Count Poet Laureate is Gwendolyn Morgan, serving 2018-2020

Inaugural Clark County Poet Laureate Christopher Luna, 2013-2018

West Virginia

Karl Myers served as the first poet laureate of West Virginia from 1927 to 1937.

Wisconsin

The current Poet Laureate of Wisconsin is Dasha Kelly Hamilton, 2021–2022.

Wyoming

Eugene Gagliano has been the Poet Laureate of Wyoming since July 2016.

References

External links
Poet Laureate of Canada 
Map of Canadian Poets Laureate
Poets Laureate of South Africa
 List of U.S. Poets Laureate at the Library of Congress
 Poets Laureate for the Commonwealth (state) of VIRGINIA, United States of America via The Poetry Society of Virginia
 Poet Laureate of Winona, Minnesota (2009 -)

Positions within the British Royal Household
 
Poets